Purva (also Romanized as Pūrvā and Pūravā; also known as Pūrā) is a village in Zarem Rud Rural District, Hezarjarib District, Neka County, Mazandaran Province, Iran. At the 2006 census, its population was 415, in 114 families.

References 

Populated places in Neka County